Ikuno Station is the name of two train stations in Japan:

 Ikuno Station (Hokkaidō)
 Ikuno Station (Hyōgo)